Coddingtonia is a genus of Asian ray spiders that was first described by J. A. Miller, C. E. Griswold, & C. M. Yin in 2009. It is a senior synonym of Luangnam.

Species
 it contains six species, all found in Asia:
Coddingtonia anaktakun Labarque & Griswold, 2014 – Malaysia
Coddingtonia discobulbus (Wunderlich, 2011) – Laos
Coddingtonia erhuan Feng & Lin, 2019 – China
Coddingtonia euryopoides Miller, Griswold & Yin, 2009 (type) – China
Coddingtonia huifengi Feng & Lin, 2019 – Indonesia (Sumatra)
Coddingtonia lizu Feng & Lin, 2019 – China (Hainan)

See also
 List of Theridiosomatidae species

References

Further reading

Araneomorphae genera
Spiders of Asia
Theridiosomatidae